Ronald Gutiérrez Flores (born December 2, 1979 in San José de Pocitos, Tarija) is a retired Bolivian football midfielder.
 
Gutiérrez's former clubs are Chaco Petrolero, The Strongest, La Paz F.C., Bolívar and Guabirá in his native country. He also played briefly for the Turkish club Bursaspor.

Club career
Gutiérrez began his career in the summer of 1999 when he signed for The Strongest. After nearly eight years and over 240 appearances for the atigrados, he transferred to La Paz F.C. before the 2007 season. That year he was declared as the best player in Bolivian first division, leading La Paz F.C. to a berth in the Copa Libertadores 2008. His good form was rewarded with a transfer to Bursaspor from the Turkcell Super League in 2008. After a short spell in Turkey, Gutiérrez returned to Bolivia in January 2009 and signed a two-year contract with Club Bolívar. With the arrival of a new manager, his presence was no longer needed, and the club decided to loan him to Nacional Potosí for the remaining of the 2009 season, and subsequently to Guabirá in 2010.

International career
Since 2007, Gutiérrez has been capped for the Bolivia national team in 3 occasions, all of those FIFA World Cup qualification matches.

References

External links

 

1979 births
Living people
People from Tarija Department
Association football midfielders
Bolivian footballers
Bolivia international footballers
Nacional Potosí players
The Strongest players
Bursaspor footballers
Club Bolívar players
Guabirá players
Bolivian expatriate footballers
Expatriate footballers in Turkey
Süper Lig players